These are the official results of the Women's Points Race at the 2000 Summer Olympics in Sydney, Australia. There were a total number of 17 participants competing in the final, which was held on 21 September 2000.

The women's points race in cycling at the 2000 Summer Olympics consisted of a 100 laps (25 kilometre) points race with 10 sprints where points were awarded.  5 points were given to the first finisher of each sprint, with 3 going to the second-place finisher, 2 going to the third place cyclist, and 1 going to the fourth place rider.  Double points were award in the final sprint. The winner is determined first by number of laps, and then by the total number of points accumulated.

Medalists

Results

References

External links
 Official Report

Cycling at the 2000 Summer Olympics
Cycling at the Summer Olympics – Women's points race
Track cycling at the 2000 Summer Olympics
Olymp
Women's events at the 2000 Summer Olympics